Keyes is a census-designated place (CDP) in Stanislaus County, California, United States. The population was 5,601 at the 2010 census, up from 4,575 at the 2000 census. It is part of the Modesto Metropolitan Statistical Area.

Geography
Keyes is located at  (37.561800, -120.917361).

Demographics

2010
At the 2010 census Keyes had a population of 5,601. The racial makeup of Keyes was 3,109 (55.5%) White, 71 (1.3%) African American, 60 (1.1%) Native American, 200 (3.6%) Asian, 32 (0.6%) Pacific Islander, 1,919 (34.3%) from other races, and 210 (3.7%) from two or more races. Hispanic or Latino of any race were 3,233 persons (57.7%).

The census reported that 5,572 people (99.5% of the population) lived in households, 29 (0.5%) lived in non-institutionalized group quarters, and no one was institutionalized.

There were 1,588 households, 837 (52.7%) had children under the age of 18 living in them, 862 (54.3%) were opposite-sex married couples living together, 270 (17.0%) had a female householder with no husband present, 144 (9.1%) had a male householder with no wife present.  There were 123 (7.7%) unmarried opposite-sex partnerships, and 8 (0.5%) same-sex married couples or partnerships. 235 households (14.8%) were one person and 93 (5.9%) had someone living alone who was 65 or older. The average household size was 3.51.  There were 1,276 families (80.4% of households); the average family size was 3.88.

The age distribution was 1,877 people (33.5%) under the age of 18, 590 people (10.5%) aged 18 to 24, 1,517 people (27.1%) aged 25 to 44, 1,168 people (20.9%) aged 45 to 64, and 449 people (8.0%) who were 65 or older.  The median age was 29.5 years. For every 100 females, there were 99.9 males.  For every 100 females age 18 and over, there were 96.4 males.

There were 1,714 housing units at an average density of 605.9 per square mile, of the occupied units 1,063 (66.9%) were owner-occupied and 525 (33.1%) were rented. The homeowner vacancy rate was 3.4%; the rental vacancy rate was 6.9%.  3,622 people (64.7% of the population) lived in owner-occupied housing units and 1,950 people (34.8%) lived in rental housing units.

2000
At the 2000 census there were 4,575 people, 1,391 households, and 1,065 families in the CDP. The racial makeup of the CDP was 61.99% White, 0.59% African American, 1.99% Native American, 3.26% Asian, 0.26% Pacific Islander, 27.63% from other races, and 4.28% from two or more races. Hispanic or Latino of any race were 41.14%.

Of the 1,391 households 43.4% had children under the age of 18 living with them, 55.1% were married couples living together, 16.0% had a female householder with no husband present, and 23.4% were non-families. 18.8% of households were one person and 8.3% were one person aged 65 or older.  The average household size was 3.29 and the average family size was 3.75.

The age distribution was 35.1% under the age of 18, 8.7% from 18 to 24, 29.4% from 25 to 44, 17.8% from 45 to 64, and 9.1% 65 or older.  The median age was 30 years. For every 100 females, there were 97.7 males.  For every 100 females age 18 and over, there were 94.8 males.

The median household income was $31,734 and the median family income  was $34,444. Males had a median income of $29,787 versus $20,625 for females. The per capita income for the CDP was $11,865.  About 19.5% of families and 21.0% of the population were below the poverty line, including 25.0% of those under age 18 and 17.5% of those age 65 or over.

Government

In 2012, a Stanislaus County Sheriff Department officer stun-gunned and shot an unarmed man.

Keyes Fire Protection District

The Keyes Fire Department is an all volunteer, all risk fire department serving the community of Keyes and the surrounding areas. The department also responds to mutual aid with surrounding departments. The department has operated since 1943. The department has approximately 17 men: 5 captains, 6 engineers, and 6 firefighters. These members train every Wednesday night and the last Saturday of each month for the day. KFPD has several pieces of apparatus that it utilizes to respond to emergencies.

Engine 40

Engine 1 is a Rosenbauer EXT Type 1 engine. It can seat 6 people and carries 1000 gallons of water and it can pump 1500 GPM. It is the first piece of apparatus used for medical aids, vehicle accidents, rescues, and structure fires. It carries 1,000 ft. 3" supply line, 650 ft. 1-3/4", 800 ft. 2-1/2", 100 ft. 1-1/2", 25 ft. 1-1/2" It carries tools and rope for low angle rope operations, Hurst Extrication tools, stabilization tools, and airbags.

Brush 40 

Brush 51 is a Westmark Navstar 7400 Type 3 brush truck. It seats 5 and carries 522 gal. of water and can pump at 500 GPM. It is the first out engine for brush fires. It carries 600 ft. of 3" supply line, 425 ft. 1-1/2", 100 ft. 1", as well as Wildland Packs

Grass 40

Grass 55 is a modified Ford F550 XL Type 6 grass rig. It carries 300 gal. of water and can pump at 200 GPM. It also carries a set of Hurst Extrication Tools. This unit carries 150' of 1" reel line, 175' of 1 1/2" hose, as well as wildland packs.

Water Tender 40

Tender 61 is a Ferrera International 7400 4X6 water tender. It carries 3000 gal. of water. If required, this rig could act as a pumper for fire attack with its 1250 GPM pump. It carries 500 ft. of  3" supply line, 200 ft. Reel Line, 150 ft. 1-1/2".

Census-designated places in Stanislaus County, California
Census-designated places in California